Fernando Varela Ramos (born 1 September 1979) is a Spanish retired footballer. Mainly a right midfielder, he could also operate as an attacking right-back, being noted for his long-range strikes.

He amassed La Liga totals of 257 matches and 13 goals over 11 seasons, in representation of Betis and Mallorca. He won one Copa del Rey with the former club.

Club career

Betis
Born in Dos Hermanas, Province of Seville, Varela was a youth player at local Real Betis, and made his first-team – and La Liga – debut in 1996–97's closing stages, in a 1–1 away draw against Valencia CF. In the 2001–02 season, after a six-month stint with Segunda División club CF Extremadura, he established himself definitely with the main squad, appearing in 25 league games.

Over six full campaigns with Betis, Varela only scored three goals, but they were noted as some of the best in the Andalusians' history, including once against FC Barcelona where, from his own half, he dribbled past five opponents struck the ball into the top corner with his left foot (2002–03), and a fantastic left-footed volley against city rivals Sevilla FC in 2005–06.

Mallorca
Varela moved to RCD Mallorca for 2006–07. He had a slow start, which culminated in two red cards in the first 11 matches. Towards the end of the season he was fully reinstated as right midfielder, being more involved in the team's offence and netting three times, including one against Real Madrid on the final matchday as the hosts eventually won 3–1 and conquered the league title.

The following campaign, incidentally against Real Madrid, Varela scored twice, but Mallorca lost again in Spain's capital (4–3), on 11 November 2007. In 2009–10, as the Balearic Islands club finished fifth and qualified for the UEFA Europa League, he lost his importance in the team and only made 15 league appearances whilst completing just three, due to both injuries and the emergence of Uruguayan Chory Castro.

Later years
In July 2010, at nearly 31, Varela left his country for the first time, joining Turkish side Kasımpaşa SK.

Honours
Betis
Copa del Rey: 2004–05

Spain U20
FIFA World Youth Championship: 1999

References

External links

 (1st part)
 (2nd part)

1979 births
Living people
Spanish footballers
Footballers from Dos Hermanas
Association football defenders
Association football midfielders
La Liga players
Segunda División players
Segunda División B players
Betis Deportivo Balompié footballers
Real Betis players
CF Extremadura footballers
RCD Mallorca players
Real Valladolid players
Süper Lig players
Kasımpaşa S.K. footballers
Spain youth international footballers
Spain under-21 international footballers
Spanish expatriate footballers
Expatriate footballers in Turkey
Spanish expatriate sportspeople in Turkey